The  is the 11th edition of the Japan Film Professional Awards. It awarded the best of 2001 in film. The ceremony took place on April 6, 2002 at Shin-Bungeiza in Tokyo.

Awards 
Best Film: Ichi the Killer
Best Director: Takashi Miike (Ichi the Killer, Visitor Q, The Guys from Paradise)
Best Actress: Kumiko Asō (Pulse, Zeitaku na Hone, 0cm4)
Best Actor: Susumu Terajima (Sora no Ana, Misuzu)
Best New Encouragement: Aoi Miyazaki (Eureka)
Best New Director: Shin Togashi (Off-Balance)
Special: Satoshi Tsumabuki&Boys (Waterboys)

10 best films
 Ichi the Killer (Takashi Miike)
 Eureka (Shinji Aoyama)
 Pulse (Kiyoshi Kurosawa)
 All About Lily Chou-Chou (Shunji Iwai)
 Kazahana (Shinji Sōmai)
 Pistol Opera (Seijun Suzuki)
 Off-Balance (Shin Togashi)
 Waterboys (Shinobu Yaguchi)
 Visitor Q (Takashi Miike)
 Tōkyō Erotica Shibireru Kairaku (Takahisa Zeze)

References

External links
  

Japan Film Professional Awards
2002 in Japanese cinema
Japan Film Professional Awards
April 2002 events in Japan